Mavis Ama Frimpong is a Ghanaian politician who held Birim North District Chief Executive position prior to being selected to be the deputy Eastern Regional Minister of Ghana. She was further appointed to the position of Eastern Regional Minister of Ghana during the John Dramani Mahama administration

References

Living people
National Democratic Congress (Ghana) politicians
Year of birth missing (living people)